CEDC may refer to:

 Central European Defence Cooperation
 Central European Development Corporation
 Central European Distribution Corporation, owner of Bols (brand)
 Clark Electric Distribution Corporation, see Electricity sector in the Philippines
 Community Enterprise Development Corporation, see Alaska Commercial Company